Groom Creek is an unincorporated community in Yavapai County, in the U.S. state of Arizona.

History
A post office called Groom Creek was in operation between 1901 and 1942.  The community was named for Robert Groom, a prospector.

References

Unincorporated communities in Yavapai County, Arizona
Unincorporated communities in Arizona